The Association of Iroquois and Allied Indians (AIAI) is a provincial territorial organization (PTO) mandated to defend and enhance the Indigenous and Treaty rights of its 7-member First Nations in Ontario, Canada.

A non-profit organization, AIAI was founded in 1969 in response to an era of government practices attempting to culturally and socially assimilate First Nations. AIAI provides political representation and policy analysis on behalf of these 7 nations in areas that include health, social development, education, intergovernmental affairs, and treaty rights. The group has twice made representations to the United Nations on living conditions and land claims.

Membership 
AIAI is unique among provincial associations because of the diversity of its members. AIAI represent Oneida, Mohawk, Delaware, Potawatomi, and Ojibway communities from all across Ontario. While these communities may have different languages, cultural practices and a widespread geography, they are united through AIAI to collectively protect their Indigenous and Treaty rights.

The combined population of the member bands is 20,000. These bands are the:
Batchewana First Nation of Ojibways, near Sault Ste. Marie
Caldwell First Nation, near Leamington
Hiawatha First Nation near Peterborough
Mohawks of the Bay of Quinte, near Belleville
Moravian of the Thames (Delaware Nation), near Chatham
Oneida Nation of the Thames, near London
Wahta Mohawks near Parry Sound

Political Leadership 
AIAI is governed by a Chiefs Council, composed of elected Chiefs from each member Nation. Chiefs Council is led by a Grand Chief and Deputy Grand Chief and meets on a quarterly basis.

Members of Chiefs Council
 Grand Chief Gord Peters
 Deputy Grand Chief Denise Stonefish 
 Chief Dean Sayers, Batchewana
 Chief Louise Hillier, Caldwell 
 Chief Greg Peters, Delaware 
 Chief Laurie Carr, Hiawatha
 Chief R. Donald Maracle, Mohawks of the Bay of Quinte
 Chief Sheri Doxtator, Oneida 
 Chief Philip Franks, Wahta

References
Association of Iroquois and Allied Indians website, "About Us" page

 
First Nations organizations in Ontario
Iroquois
Organizations established in 1969